Asymphorodes flexa is a moth in the  family Agonoxenidae. It is found on Fiji.

References

Natural History Museum Lepidoptera generic names catalog

Agonoxeninae
Moths of Fiji
Endemic fauna of Fiji
Taxa named by Edward Meyrick
Moths described in 1921